The Muslim World League (MWL;) is an International Islamic NGO based in Mecca, Saudi Arabia that promotes what it calls the true message of Islam by advancing moderate values that promote peace, tolerance and love.

The NGO has been funded by the Saudi government from its inception in 1962, with that contribution growing to approximately $13 million by 1980. Because of the Saudi funding, the League is widely recognized as a representative of the Islamic principles promoted in that country. Under Saudi Arabia's modernization agenda, Vision 2030, the country has embraced a moderate form of Islam, which the Muslim World League seeks to promote in Saudi Arabia and around the world. The Oxford Dictionary of Islam says that "the group has acted as a mouthpiece for the Saudi Arabian government, which finances it."

Muhammad bin Abdul Karim Issa is the General Secretary. The organization propagates the religion of Islam, encouraging Dawah and conversion of non-Muslims, and rebuke and debunk criticism of Islam. The organization funds the construction of mosques, financial reliefs for Muslims afflicted by natural disasters, the distribution of copies of the Quran, and political tracts on Muslim minority groups. The League says that they reject all acts of violence and promote dialogue with the people of other cultures, within their understanding of Sharia, but they are no strangers to controversy, having been the subject of several ongoing counterterrorism investigations in the U.S. related to Hamas, al Qaeda and other terrorist groups.

However, since 2016, the Muslim World League has been widely recognized as one of the leading organizations in Saudi Arabia dedicated to combating extremist ideology. Government officials have commended the Muslim World League for its commitment to confronting hatred, disunity and violence closely associated with extremism. In its 2019 Country Reports on Terrorism, the U.S. State Department stated that the Muslim World League's Secretary General, Dr. Al-Issa "pressed a message of interfaith dialogue, religious tolerance, and peaceful coexistence with global religious authorities, including Muslim imams outside the Arab world," as well as conducted extensive outreach to prominent U.S. Jewish and Christian leaders.

The League founded the International Islamic Relief Organization in 1978.

History
The Muslim World League was founded in accordance with a resolution adopted during the meeting of the General Islamic Conference which was held in Makkah on the 14th of Dhul Hijjah 1381 Hijra, corresponding to 18 May 1962.

Following a meeting of 22 Muslim religious leaders held in 1962, the Muslim World League saw the light under the auspices of then Crown prince  Faisal.

The Muslim World League has had eight Secretaries General since its founding. Under Secretary General Dr. Al-Issa, the Muslim World League has embraced a notable shift in objectives and priorities, breaking long-held taboos in the Muslim world to reflect the organization's obligation to promote the values of true Islam and demonstrate responsible leadership.

Objectives
The Muslim World League's mission is to introduce Islam and the moderate values presented in the Quran and Sunnah. Further, the Muslim World League seeks to spread a message of "peace and harmony" that strengthens Islam's resolve and unity around the world. The organization also combats extremist ideology by promoting and clarifying the facts through education, traditional, digital and social media, and international conferences.

The Muslim World League claims to not only defend the rights of Muslim minorities, but all minorities that face discrimination, and overt and covert forms of oppression. The Washington Times quoted the League's Secretary General saying that the organization "embraces the full range of Muslim beliefs and seeks to downplay sectarian divides – including that between Sunni and Shiite Muslims." In regards to protecting the rights of minorities outside of Islam, the Muslim World League's leadership wrote in a 2019 Newsweek opinion editorial piece that the Charter of Makkah "demands that we preserve the human rights of all people, including women and minorities."

According to the Muslim World League's website, the organization places significant emphasis on civilizational rapprochement through constructive dialogue and engagement. In 2018, Dr. Al-Issa stated that Muslims and non-Muslims alike have an obligation to call for civilizational rapprochement that promotes and shares values and common interests, "in addition to the advancement of the concept of human brotherhood that calls for reinforcing the feeling of love, cooperation and understanding." Additionally, the organization promotes peaceful and harmonious coexistence between Islam and the world's largest religions, especially, but not limited to, Christianity and Judaism.

Each year, the Muslim World League utilizes the Hajj season to gather respected Islamic voices, scholars and leaders in Mecca, Saudi Arabia to exchange views and discuss how to best raise the standards and promote true moderate Islamic principles around the world. The Muslim World League also gathers and meets with global thought leaders, scholars, intellectuals, local and national community leaders, and heads of organizations to find solutions to the array of issues facing the world today.

Charter of Makkah 
In 2019, the Muslim World League largely contributed to the conception and realization of the Charter of Makkah, a landmark agreement that aims to provide Muslims with the true, moderate and inclusive principles of Islam.

Th Charter of Makkah, signed during a historic gathering of more than 1,200 Islamic scholars, Imams and leaders from 139 countries, consists of 30 unique principle points that call for the world to combat extremism and hatred, fight against injustice and oppression, and reject violations of human rights in all its forms. The Charter strives to articulate the need for equality, religious harmony and tolerance, women empowerment, and coexistence.

Founding Charter

We the members of the Muslim World League, representing it religiously, hereby undertake before God, Almighty to:
· Discharge our obligation towards God, by conveying and proclaiming His Message all over the world. We also reaffirm our belief that there shall be no peace in the world without the application of the principles of Islam.
· Invite all communities to vie with one another for the common good and happiness of mankind, establish social justice and a better human society.
· Call upon God to bear witness that we do not intend to undermine, dominate or practice hegemony over anyone else. Hence, in order to further these goals, we intend to:
· Unite the ranks of the Muslims, and remove all divisive forces from the midst of the Muslim communities around the world.
· Remove obstacles in the way of establishing the Muslim world union.
· Support all advocates of charitable deeds.
· Utilize our spiritual as well as material and moral potentialities in furthering the aims of this charter.
· Unify efforts in order to achieve these purposes in a positive and practical way.
· Reject all the pre-tenses of ancient as well as contemporary Jahiliah (attitudes of the pre-Islamic era).
· Always reaffirm the fact that Islam has no place for either regionalism or racism.

Jurisdiction 

 Laying down plans designed to revive the role of the Mosque in the fields of guidance, education, preaching and provision of social services.
 Publishing the ‘Message of the Mosque’ periodical, which deals with finding ways and means of raising the standard of the cultural as well as technical efficiency of the Imams and the Khateebs.
 Publishing Islamic books and pamphlets.
 Conducting a comprehensive survey of the world's Mosques and publishing the information gathered in book form and in the shape of periodical bulletins.
 Selecting and posting groups of well qualified preachers on guidance missions throughout the Mosques of the world.
 Organizing local or regional refresher courses to enrich the culture of the Imams and the Khateebs and to raise the standard of their efficiency.
 Formation of board of directors to supervise the affairs of each and every Mosque at the national as well as the regional levels.
 Studying the ideas and patterns of behavior that contravene the teachings of Islam.
 Helping in rehabilitating and training Imams and Khateebs for posting to the various Muslim areas to lead Muslims in prayers, deliver sermons and guidance lessons.

Structure

Office of the Secretary General 
The Office of the Secretary General of the Muslim World League is the executive wing of the organization. It supervises the day-to-day activities of the MWL, and implements the policies and resolutions adopted by the Constituent Council. The office includes the Secretary General, assistant secretaries and the general staff. The Secretariat's headquarters is located in Makkah, Saudi Arabia.

Dr. Mohammad bin Abdulkarim Al-Issa is the current secretary general of the Muslim World League.

Subsidiary Bodies

The MWL is organized into six subsidiary bodies under the oversight of the Secretary General. 
	
The Supreme Council

Comprising sixty prominent Muslim scholars, the Constituent Council is the highest authority within the MWL. The Constituent Council makes policy recommendations to the Secretary General. It includes representatives from various sects of Islam, ensuring the representation of the various Muslim communities around the world within the Muslim World League.

The World Supreme Council for Mosques

The World Supreme Council for Mosques seeks to provide resources and protection for mosques around the world.
The WSCM has an independent legal personality. It aims at reactivating the mission of the Mosque as a vital focal point of the religious as well as the temporal life of the Muslim. Ultimately, the WSCM aims at restoring the Mosque's role to what it was during the early days of Islam. It also strives to protect Mosques and Islamic trusts against assault, and to maintain the sanctity and purity of the Mosque. The WSCM was founded in compliance with a resolution adopted by the "Message of the Mosque" conference, which was held in Holy Makkah during the month of Ramadan 1395 (September 1975) under the auspices of the Muslim World League.

The Islamic Fiqh Council

Fiqh is Islamic jurisprudence, seeking solutions to the problems for which the 	Qur’an does not give clear instructions. Within the Muslim World League, the Islamic Fiqh Council composed of a select group of Muslim jurists and scholars who consider the serious issues concerning the Muslim Ummah.

The International Organization for Relief, Welfare and Development

The International Organization for Relief, Welfare, and Development is among the most active organizations within the Muslim World League. Founded in 1978 in Saudi Arabia as the International Islamic Relief Organization, it provides aid to Muslim and non-Muslim communities in need around the world. 
In 2019, the International Organization for Relief, Welfare and Development completed the League Boreholes Project in Ghana to provide clean drinking water to several communities. 
The organization has sponsored several health centers in Africa, including surgery centers in Nigeria, Senegal, Ghana, Burundi, and Zimbabwe.
The centers provide cataract surgery free of charge to elderly patients.
Additionally, the organization has sponsored several orphanages, providing educational materials, clothing, and security to vulnerable children in Pakistan, Ghana, and elsewhere.
 
The International Organization for the Quran and Sunnah

The International Organization for the Quran and Sunnah is dedicated to assisting scholars in teaching and memorizing the Quran. The Muslim World League's International Organization for the Quran and Sunnah strives to ensure the values of true Islam permeate the work and teachings of Muslim scholars around the world.
 
The World Organization of Muslim Scholars

The World Organization of Muslim Scholars was founded in 2003 as a resolution of the Fourth General Islamic Conference. The organization serves to unite and clarify the attitudes of Muslim scholars and intellectuals as they address the emerging challenges facing Muslim communities around the world.

Activities 
Under Secretary General Dr. Al-Issa, the MWL frequently participates in and hosts international events, in addition to playing an active role in humanitarian aid projects around the world.

Commemorating the 75th Anniversary of the Liberation of Auschwitz 
In January 2020, Dr. Al-Issa became the most senior Muslim leader to visit the German Nazi concentration and extermination camp. Leading up to the anniversary, Dr. Al-Issa published an opinion editorial in The Washington Post, "Why Muslims around the world should remember the Holocaust," decrying the practice of Holocaust denial.

As part of this visit, Dr. Al-Issa lit candles before the Death Wall at Auschwitz I and the International Monument at Auschwitz II-Birkenau. Dr. Al-Issa also visited the POLIN Museum of the History of Polish Jews and the Nozyk Synagogue, the only surviving prewar Jewish house of prayer in Warsaw. In an article published by the American Jewish Committee, Dr. Al-Issa stated on his visit to Auschwitz, "To be here, among the children of Holocaust survivors and members of the Jewish and Islamic communities, is both a sacred duty and a profound honor. The unconscionable crimes to which we bear witness today are truly crimes against humanity. That is to say, a violation of us all, an affront to all of God’s children."

International Conferences 
Scandinavia Symposiums

In November 2019, the Muslim World League partnered with the Scandinavian Council for Relations, a non-profit organization dedicated to promoting interreligious dialogue and diversity in Scandinavia. Together, the Muslim World League and Scandinavian Council for Relations hosted three symposiums in Copenhagen, Denmark; Oslo, Norway; and Stockholm, Sweden to address global issues like national identify, intellectual security, human brotherhood and human trafficking.

The Paris International Conference for Peace and Solidarity

In September 2019, the Muslim World League joined the Foundation for Islam in France to host the Paris International Conference for Peace and Solidarity. The symposium concluded with a Memorandum of Understanding and Friendship between leaders of the Abrahamic religions in France. The memorandum was signed by Mr. Haim Korsia, Chief Rabbi of France; Mr. François Clavairoly, President of the Council of Christian Churches in France; Monsignor Emmanuel Adamakis, President of the Assembly of Orthodox Bishops of France; and Dr. Al-Issa. The witnesses of the agreement included Moché Lewin, vice-president of the Conference of European Rabbis; Father Vincent Feroldi, Director of the National Service for Relations with Muslims of the Conference of Bishops of France; and Ghaleb Bencheikh, President of the Foundation of Islam in France.

Responsible Leaders Summit

In May 2019, the Centre for Responsible Leadership, a partnership between the Muslim World League and the World Council for Religious Leaders hosted the inaugural Responsible Leaders Summit at the United Nations. Leaders from business, finance, religion, politics, media, and the environment participated in high-level workshops in an effort to solve some of the world's greatest challenges.

The five solution sessions addressed: Restoring Civility to Public Discourse; Economic Inequality; Safeguarding Our Planet; Uniting the Faithful; and Ensuring Gender Equality.  The day-long symposium concluded with an awards ceremony, presenting the 2019 Responsible Leadership Awards to: Ann Curry for Truth in Media; Alex Gorsky for Engaged Leadership; Christian Rynning-Tønnesen for Excellence in Sustainability; and Rabbi Arthur Schneier for A Lifetime of Achievement.

The General Islamic Conference 

The General Islamic Conference is the highest policy making body that expresses the feelings and aspirations of Muslim peoples around the world. It is the source of the League's legitimacy and capacity as the spokesman of Muslims worldwide. The GIC consists of leading Islamic preachers and activists who meet annually to review major issues facing Islam and Muslims and to find appropriate solutions for the realization of Muslim interests and aspirations.

The GIC has met on several occasions so far as follows:
 The General Islamic Conference, held its first meeting in the year 1381 Hijra (1962), and passed the resolution to establish the Muslim World League.
 The General Islamic Conference held its second meeting in the year 1381 Hijra (1965), and issued recommendations supporting the idea of the Islamic solidarity, removing from its path, obstacles such as lack of commitment to religious commandments, sectarian prejudice, and conflict of regional interests, foreign influence and alien thought.
 The General Islamic Conference held its third meeting in the year 1408 Hijra (1987) and adopted a significant recommendation on the need to believe in the sacredness of the two Holy Mosques, glorify Holy Makkah, the sacred months, Hajj rituals and the responsibility of the Muslim ruler of the two Holy Mosques to establish. security therein.
 The General Islamic Conference held its fourth meeting in the year 1423 Hijra (2002) and passed resolutions concerning the Ummah (worldwide Islamic community), Da’wa (Islamic propagation), globalization and other issues concerning Muslims. It also issued the Makkah charter for Islamic action, a statement on Palestine and a decision to for a higher body for coordination and an international forum for Muslim scholars and intellectuals.

In 1974, the League declared that Ahmadis and related groups are out of the fold of Islam, banned from the Holy lands and should be boycotted socially, economically and culturally 

In 2015,  Abdallah Ben Abdel Mohsen At-Turki spoke on behalf of the speakers at the conference and commenting on the violence caused by Islamic State of Iraq and the Levant, he said: "The terrorism that we face within the Muslim Ummah and our own homelands today … is religiously motivated. It has been founded on extremism, and the misconception of some distorted Sharia concept."

Halal certification 
The MWL has a number of regionally based Islamic cultural centres that oversee the certification of halal meat products in various countries around the world. Only meat approved by MWL-affiliated centres can be imported to the Kingdom of Saudi Arabia. Much of its work in this field is organised through the International Islamic Halal Organization, a constituent body of the MWL founded to spread awareness of the importance of halal foods.

Aid for Stranded Pakistanis
In 1988, the Muslim World League together with Al Falah and Heed International - came forward and established semi-pucca houses for the Stranded Pakistanis in Bangladesh.

Publications
The Muslim World League publishes the monthly Journal of the Muslim World League in Arabic and English. It also publishes a weekly News of the Muslim World.

International affiliations 
 The United Nations Organization: Observer in General Consultative Status with the ECOSOC. With the MWL's General Consultative Status, the highest level granted, the organization has the authority to make substantive oral presentations during Council meetings. 
 Organization of Islamic Cooperation: Muslim World League holds observer status in OIC for all meetings and conferences.
 Islamic World Educational, Scientific and Cultural Organization (ICESCO): The Muslim World League signed an agreement of cooperation and partnership with ICESCO in 2019.
 UNICEF: Member
 UNHCR: The MWL  contributed one million dollars to the UNHCR in 2019 to support refugees worldwide.

Controversy
In October 2001, Newsweek writer Evan Thomas reported that "Two interrelated global charities directly financed by the Saudi government--the International Islamic Relief Organization and the Muslim World League --have been used by bin Laden to finance his operations. The organizations were left off the list of groups sanctioned by the United States last week, U.S. officials hinted to NEWSWEEK, in order to avoid embarrassing the Saudi government."

According to the Anti-Defamation League, the MWL has frequently been a platform for anti-Israeli rhetoric. In 2008, it invited Yusuf al-Qaradawi to speak at their first International Islamic Conference on Dialogue in Mecca in June 2008. During his speech at the conference, he said he would "never sit with Jews on one platform and never hold dialogue with those Jews who have committed injustice against us and support Israel."

References

External links

Muslim World League official English site
Muslim World League official site (in Arabic)

Islamic organisations based in Saudi Arabia
Islamic organizations established in 1962